Shah Reza (also Romanized as Shāh Rez̤ā; also known as Ḩoseyn Beygī) is a village in Beyranvand-e Jonubi Rural District, Bayravand District, Khorramabad County, Lorestan Province, Iran. At the 2006 census, its population was 11, in 4 families.

References 

Towns and villages in Khorramabad County